Kaspars Cipruss (born February 2, 1982) is a Latvian basketball player.

Club career
Born in Rezekne, Latvia, Cipruss started his basketball career in Latvian powerhouse ASK/Brocēni/LMT in 1998. After extinction of the team he had a brief spell in Latvian team BK Gulbenes Buki.

In 2000, he drew interest from Rutgers, Wake Forest, North Carolina State, Georgia Tech, UNLV and Boston College. Cipruss signed a letter of intent to play basketball at Rutgers, but he had letter-of-intent problem, so he decided instead to play professionally in Europe.

Therefore, he moved to Italy, joining Lega Basket Serie A team Pallacanestro Trieste. Soon after he signed a 3-year contract with Slovenian Euroleague team KK Union Olimpija, but was loaned to KD Slovan. Since then he has played professional basketball in Poland, various levels in Spain, United Arab Emirates, Czech Republic, Estonia and Lithuania.

On 23 January 2015, he signed with Barons/LDz of the Latvian Basketball League.

National team

Cipruss started his Latvia national basketball team career with the youngest, U16 team. Few years later, in 1998 he was part of the team which managed to achieve 9th place at the FIBA Under-19 World Championship and semi-final spot in the U19 EuroBasket. Three years later he was also part of the senior team, which reached the quarterfinals of EuroBasket 2001. Later on he has also been in the final tournaments in 2005 and 2007.

Achievements
Latvijas Basketbola līga: 1997-98, 1998–99
Runner-up 2001-02, 2006–07

Individual
BBL Challenge Cup MVP: 2011-12
Estonian Basketball Championship MVP: 2011-12

References

1982 births
Living people
BC Lietkabelis players
BC Odesa players
BC Rakvere Tarvas players
BK Barons players
BK Liepājas Lauvas players
BK Ventspils players
CB Breogán players
Centers (basketball)
Latvian expatriate basketball people in Estonia
KK Olimpija players
Korvpalli Meistriliiga players
Latvian men's basketball players
Latvian expatriates in Estonia
Liga ACB players
Pallacanestro Trieste players
People from Rēzekne
Real Betis Baloncesto players
Unia Tarnów basketball players
Shabab Al Ahli Basket players